Prosper Jean Levot (14 December 1801 – 3 February 1878) was a French librarian and historian, author of several books on the history of Brest, Brittany and the French Navy.

Sources

Bibliography 
 

1801 births
1878 deaths
French naval historians
French librarians
19th-century French historians
History of Brest, France
History of Brittany
French male non-fiction writers
19th-century French male writers